Keith Donohue may refer to:

 Keith Donohue (novelist) (born 1960), American novelist
 Keith Donohue (cricketer) (born 1963), English cricketer